The Factions are fictional philosophically based power groups in the Planescape campaign setting for the Dungeons & Dragons fantasy role-playing game.

Background
While the Lady of Pain is considered the ultimate ruler of the planar metropolis called Sigil, "the City of Doors", the Factions perform virtually all the actual administrative and practical functions of the city. They are the ones the people look to for authority; the Lady only gives edicts or appears personally under rare circumstances. Each of the Factions is based around one particular belief system; many of the Factions' beliefs make them enemies where their other goals and actions might have made them allies. All Factions hold many secrets from non-members and even their own members, for the fewer who know a secret, the more secret it is (and these are secrets of power, either wielded or potentially gained by the Faction's adversaries).

There are fifteen Factions in total, per decree of the Lady of Pain; any additional factions emerging would be subject to her wrath (unless they destroy one of the current 15). At one point there were many more Factions, but after a war referred to as the Great Upheaval amongst the factions, the Lady of Pain decreed that they had two weeks to get the number down to 15 or she would kill them all. The Free League membership swelled to over a million, compared to the 20,000 or so members present day.

Factions are led by a Factol. Other high-ranking faction members are called Factors, and mid-level faction members are called Factotums. The lowest-ranking members are called Namers because many of them have only a tenuous faith in their faction's philosophy and are thus members in name only.

Original factions

Athar
Also known as "the Defiers" or "the Lost", they deny not only the gods' right to pass judgment over mortals, but their very divinity.  They claim that the gods (whom they call "powers") are powerful but have limits and do not deserve worship. Instead, Athar priests channel divine power from what they call the "Great Unknown", or what they believe to be the true divine force behind everything. Their headquarters in Sigil is the Shattered Temple, the former temple of the dead god Aoskar. Following the faction war, and banned from Sigil, they moved their headquarters to the base of the infinite spire where divine magic does not function in protection of the many gods they have offended.  The Athar are broadly derived from real-world atheists, agnostics, and Deists.

Believers of the Source
Known as "Godsmen" they believe that each life is a test, and that every person has the potential to become a god.  Their headquarters is the Great Foundry, symbolizing their belief that the multiverse constantly forges and refines all beings.  Shares many parallels with Hindu, Buddhism, and most sects of Mormonism. However, the ultimate goal is not Nirvana but apotheosis.

Bleak Cabal
"Bleakers" or "Madmen" deny that any belief system has any merit; as they see it, the universe has physical rules, but no metaphysical or philosophical ones, therefore any meaning in life must come from within.  Their headquarters is the insane asylum of Sigil, called the Gatehouse.  They are derived from real-life existentialists and the philosophy of Friedrich Nietzsche.

Doomguard
The "Sinkers" believe in the sanctity and inevitability of entropy, particularly the inevitable destruction of all things.  The core of their belief is that everything ends.  Their headquarters is Sigil's Armory, where they forge weapons as tools of destruction.

Dustmen
Also known as "the Dead", they believe that both life and death are false states of existence, that there is a state of True Death which can only be accomplished by denying one's emotions and physical wants and needs (a conception similar to eternal oblivion, but also conceivably to Nirvana). Their headquarters is the Mortuary, where Sigil's dead are interred or cremated.  Their philosophy is closely related to that of Arthur Schopenhauer, along with some shared similarities with Buddhism, Stoicism and acosmism.

Fated
"Takers" or "The Heartless" believe that those with power and ability have the right to own what they control and to take what they can from those who are unable to keep it, and that it is their right to exploit any situation to their advantage, regardless of how it affects anyone else (a position akin to "might makes right", and achievement through work). Their headquarters is the Hall of Records, where they serve as the tax collectors of Sigil.  They are derived from real-life Social Darwinists and the philosophies of Max Stirner and Ayn Rand.

Fraternity of Order
These "Guvners" believe that knowledge is power; they learn and exploit both the natural laws of the universe and the laws of society.  Their headquarters is the City Court, where they serve as judges and legal advocates.  They recall the Sophists of Classical Athens.

Free League
As "Indeps", they reject the other factions and their bureaucratic, hierarchical dogmatism and do not consider themselves a faction at all.  For this reason, they don't have a factol or an official headquarters, though Sigil's Great Bazaar serves as an unofficial one. They believe in individual freedom as the highest good and are analogous to libertarians.

Harmonium
"Hardheads" believe that peace and stability can only be established under one rule — theirs.  The planar faction known as the Harmonium is actually just a small part of a much larger political entity which rules over the entirety of the Prime Material world of Ortho.  In Sigil, they serve as the city's police force, and their headquarters is the City Barracks.  They are related to present day authoritarianism, particularly religious evangelicalism and fundamentalism.  They take offense to the term "Hardhead".

Mercykillers
"The Red Death" believe in justice and retribution at the expense of all else. Their name does not come from "killing out of mercy," but rather "killing mercy." Their credo that mercy is for the weak, and the merciful should be punished. Their headquarters is Sigil's Prison, where they carry out the sentences of convicted criminals.

Revolutionary League
"Anarchists" who believe that social order and man-made laws are inherently corrupt and must be destroyed—though none of their members can agree on what, if anything, should replace them. Like the Indeps, they have no headquarters and gather in many safe houses and secret meeting places.

Sign of One
"Signers" believe that everyone is the center of their own reality, and that reality can be reshaped by the power of imagination.  Their headquarters is the Hall of Speakers, which houses Sigil's legislature.  Some of them are solipsists, though most are not so extreme.

Society of Sensation
Sensates believe that accumulating experiential knowledge through the senses is the only way to achieve enlightenment. Their headquarters is the Civic Festhall, which features an endless series of entertainments and a library of magically stored experiences. They are reminiscent of ancient Epicurianism (if not hedonism more generally), as well as the more modern empiricism.

Transcendent Order
The Cipher believe that by tapping into the 'cadence' of the planes and acting through pure instinct they can achieve a higher state of being.  Their headquarters is the Great Gymnasium, where members can train to improve their bodies and minds.  Their philosophy could be considered similar to Taoism and Zen Buddhism.

Xaositects
"Chaosmen" who believe that the only truth is revealed in chaos.  The Xaositects have been quite accurately described as being "totally off their rockers, every one of 'em."  Their headquarters is the Hive, the most disorganized part of the Sigil ward of the same name. Compare with real life discordianism.

After the Faction War 
In The Faction War, many Factions were destroyed or merged.

 Athar
who have fled to the base of the Spire, the region of the Outlands where all magic (including that of the gods) fails, to escape the wrath of the deities whom they defied. Their membership has declined due to the isolation of their new base.
 Doomguard
who now rarely leave their citadels, making forays outside only when some great act of creation (such as the formation of a new demiplane) demands a retributive act of destruction.
 Fated
who suffered a great loss of face because it was their factol, Duke Darkwood, who started the Faction War in the first place. They've moved their base of operations to Ysgard, but have otherwise changed little in their methods.
 Fraternity of Order
who relocated to the plane of Mechanus, where they already had several strongholds. The Guvners continue to delve into the laws of the planes and plot their eventual return to Sigil, which they still believe to be the fulcrum around which all worlds turn.
 Harmonium
who relocated to the plane of Arcadia. They have become less of a police force and more of a diplomatic body. The Harmonium now believes that the best way to spread order is to peacefully unite the Upper Planes under the banner of law rather than forced conversion to their ideals.
 Mind's Eye
merged from the survivors of the Believers of the Source and the Sign of One.
 Revolutionary League
which retreated to the plane of Carceri, where most of its cells fell into disarray. Most of the remaining Anarchists seek to return to Sigil in force to become its new rulers. Other members of the League are appalled at the thought of ruling anything and have formed a splinter group, the Second Wave; these "Wavers" take the dissolution of the factions as proof that any political structure can fall and have spread to numerous planar metropolises to stir up rebellion.
 Ring Givers
who believe that everything you give (and sometimes even more) will be given back to you one day.
 Sodkillers
who believe in exterminating crime with any force necessary, and one of the two factions that long ago joined to make the Mercykillers and divided in the wake of the Faction War.
 Sons of Mercy
who are concerned with redeeming and rehabilitating criminals, and one of the two factions that long ago joined to make the Mercykillers and divided in the wake of the Faction War.
 Transcendent Order
who have been barely touched by the Faction War and still run the Great Gymnasium, unofficially spreading their ideals through the Cage and the Planes. Former Factol Rhys is now a member of Sigil's city council.

Reception
Scott Haring, in his review of the Planescape Campaign Setting for Pyramid, notes that designer Zeb Cook's three-word summary of the Planescape experience is, "Philosophers With Clubs." Haring commented, "And what a batch of philosophers!", noting that "Sigil is rife with philosophical factions, all with their own take on how the universe works and what it's all about. [...] Each faction is continuously struggling to gain converts from other factions and to hang on to what they've got. Because the more people who believe the basic laws of the universe work a certain way, the more the universe tends to work in just that way. Alignment and philosophy are more than roleplaying tools -- they're the main point."

Haring described the Fraternity of Order "that believes that there is a law governing absolutely everything in the universe, and that all you have to do is learn them and you'll rule everything"; the Society of Sensation "that believes that the only way to comprehend the meaning of the universe is to personally experience every facet of it"; the Dustmen "who believe that everybody on all the planes is already dead, and that everybody came here to this depressing afterlife from somewhere else"; and the Doomguard "that believes that entropy is the ultimate destination of the universe and that they should do whatever they can to help it along".  Haring notes that "there's more, all colorful and unique".

Further reading

References

Sources

External links
Planewalker.com, the official Planescape fansite
The Clueless Inn
 TSR Archive Planescape product list

Fictional organizations
Planescape